Both Rhode Island incumbents were re-elected.

See also 
 List of United States representatives from Rhode Island
 United States House of Representatives elections, 1972

1972
Rhode Island
1972 Rhode Island elections